Eugen Tschurtschenthaler (21 November 1912 – 2 January 1974) was an Austrian skier. He competed in the military patrol at the 1936 Summer Olympics.

References

1912 births
1974 deaths
Austrian military patrol (sport) runners
Winter Olympics competitors for Austria
Military patrol competitors at the 1936 Winter Olympics